"When Love Hurts" is a song recorded by American recording artist JoJo that was intended for her third studio album, Mad Love (2016), (though didn't actually end up on it) and is included on her "tringle" (triple single) extended play (EP), III. (2015). The song was written by Ammar Malik, Benny Blanco, Daniel Omelio, Jason Evigan, creative team "The XX" and Ryn Weaver, while Blanco and Evigan also handled the production. "When Love Hurts" was the first song from the tringle to be promoted to radio via Atlantic Records. An official remix package was released on October 2, 2015. The song officially impacted Mainstream radio in the U.S. on November 17, 2015.

Composition
"When Love Hurts" is an uptempo house and dance song with a duration of three minutes and thiry-five seconds (3:35). It is instrumented by piano and synthesizers and features layered vocals. Lyrically, the song is about being moved by a strong emotion and fighting for things we love, even when it hurts.

Critical reception
Billboard praised "When Love Hurts" as the "most vivacious" song on the EP and declared it a "banger worth a thousand disco balls." Carolyn Menyes of MusicTimes gave a more mixed review, writing that the song was "the least stunning of the three," but that it was the most mainstream-friendly and succeeds at making the listener dance.

Commercial Performance
"When Love Hurts" has not entered the Billboard Hot 100 but has charted on the Hot Singles Sales component chart and also the Pop Digital Songs sales chart as well as the Hot Dance Club Songs chart.

Music video
The music video for "When Love Hurts" was shot on September 1 and was directed by Patrick "Embryo" Tapu. It premiered September 28, 2015 through MTV. The video features JoJo and various backup dancers performing the vogue and a "finger tutting" dance in an abandoned warehouse.

Track listing
Remixes EP
 "When Love Hurts (Full Crate Remix)" – 3:36
 "When Love Hurts (Chris Cox Remix)" – 6:36
 "When Love Hurts (Sweater Beats Remix)" – 3:40
 "When Love Hurts (Hugel Remix)" – 4:04
 "When Love Hurts (Etienne Ozborne Remix)" – 5:07
 "When Love Hurts (Laszlo Remix)" – 5:41

Charts

Weekly Charts

Release history

References

External links

2015 singles
JoJo (singer) songs
2015 songs
Atlantic Records singles
Songs written by Ammar Malik
Songs written by Jason Evigan
Songs written by Benny Blanco
Song recordings produced by Benny Blanco
Songs written by Robopop
Songs written by Ryn Weaver